Immersion are a sound and art duo composed of Wire & Githead's Colin Newman & Minimal Compact & Githead's Malka Spigel.

The duo made three albums in the 90's on the swim ~ label and also made video-driven performances in venues such as the Royal Festival Hall in London and the Knitting Factory in New York City. Their second album "Full Immersion" was a collaboration with a number of other electronic music artists including g-man, Claude Young, Fred Giannelli, Scanner, Vapourspace and Mick Harris.

Discography

 Oscillating (1994)
 The Full Immersion: The Remixes, Vol. 1 (1995)
 Low Impact (1999)
 Analogue Creatures (EP, 2016)
 Analogue Creatures Living on an Island (2016)
 Sleepless (2018)
 Nanocluster Vol. 1 (with Tarwater, Laetitia Sadier, Ulrich Schnauss and Scanner) (2021)

References

External links
 Full Colin Newman Discography on the swim site (with pictures)

Newman, Colin